The Romanian National Opera is a public opera and ballet institution in Timișoara, Romania. Subordinated to the Ministry of Culture, it is one of the four national opera companies of Romania. The Romanian National Opera was established by royal decree no. 254 of 30 March 1946, issued by King Michael I. The first director of the opera was Aca de Barbu. The Opera shares the same building with the Mihai Eminescu National Theatre, the Csiky Gergely Hungarian State Theatre and the German State Theatre.

History 
The Romanian Opera in Timișoara was established by royal decree no. 254 of 30 March 1946, issued by King Michael I. The management of the newly established institution was entrusted to the famous soprano Aca de Barbu, who managed to form a valuable team of musicians. The inaugural performance of the Romanian Opera in Timișoara took place on 27 April 1947 with the opera Aida by Giuseppe Verdi. The first opera performance was transmitted through megaphones in the then Opera Square and was attended by Prime Minister Petru Groza, among others. In the first ten years after its establishment, 41 opera, operetta and ballet performances were staged. Starting from 1952, the Opera held uninterrupted micro-seasons in Arad, Lugoj, Bocșa, Ciacova, Deva, Hunedoara and Reșița, until 1990. At the same time, from 1953, tours were organized around the country.

After the 6th edition, the festival became annual, and from 1993 it received an international character, preserved until today.

A premiere was made on 23 June 1964 – the first live television transmission of a whole opera, with the performance of Verdi's Un ballo in maschera. Numerous radio and television prints followed, as well as on disc and CD.

On 24 September 2004, the Romanian Opera in Timișoara was awarded the title of national opera.

Directors 
 Aca de Barbu (1946–1954)
 Francisc Kádár (1954–1956)
 Lucian Gropșianu (1956–1959)
 Viorel Covăsală (1959–1960)
 Adrian Beldi (1960–1963)
  (1963–1974)
 Cornelia Voina (1974–1977)
 Petru Manzur (1977–1983)
  (1983–1985, 1990, 1994–2000)
 Maria Mărgineanu (1985–1990)
 Virgil Bosa (1990–1994)
  (2000–2019)
 Cristian Rudic (2019–present)

See also 
 List of concert halls
 List of opera houses
 List of places in Timișoara
 Opera in Romania

References

External links 
  Official website

Romanian music
Timișoara
Timișoara
Music venues completed in 1875
Theatres completed in 1875
Buildings and structures in Timișoara
Culture in Timișoara